Kryolan is a world-wide cosmetics company founded and headquartered in Berlin, Germany. By some estimates, Kryolan creates two-thirds of global production of professional makeup for film, TV and theater.

History
Kryolan was founded in 1945 in post World War II Berlin. Kryolan's Hollywood breakthrough came with the face masks used in the 1968 feature film Planet of the Apes. After intensive rebranding, Kryolan launched its "Make-Up Is A Science" campaign, which continues to this day.

The German trade Association "The Family Entrepreneurs" honors Arnold Langer in Berlin as the "Family Entrepreneur of the Year".

In media
Kryolan was featured in season 3 of the American reality competition television series RuPaul's Drag Race, wherein thirteen drag queens competed for a prize package that included a "lifetime supply" of Kryolan makeup.

References

Chemical companies established in 1945
Cosmetics companies of Germany
Manufacturing companies based in Berlin
1945 establishments in Germany